Enes Muhić (born 21 January 1961) is a Bosnian retired football midfielder.

Club career
He debuted professionally in 1982–83 Yugoslav Second League playing with NK Jedinstvo Bihać. Playing at same level in the 1985–86 season with RFK Novi Sad where he managed to score 6 goals in 22 appearances that called the attention of local powerhouse fK Vojvodina which brought him and made him contribute in the extraordinary Yugoslav First League championship winning squad in 1988–89 season. Although he played more as a back-up role, he made 4 league appearances, and the title provided him enough prestige to open way to offers from abroad. Muhić opted for Swedish side BK Forward, where, as the club name suggests, he was given offensive tasks, scoring 15 goals in one season, quite an achievement for a midfielder. In 1992, he signed with more notorious Östers IF, but, after failing to get to starting eleven, he accepted a move to Degerfors IF, which proved to be a great decision as he managed to display his talent by scoring 6 goals out of 18 appearances.

Honours
Vojvodina
Yugoslav First League: 1988–89

References

1961 births
Living people
Association football midfielders
Yugoslav footballers
NK Jedinstvo Bihać players
RFK Novi Sad 1921 players
FK Vojvodina players
BK Forward players
Östers IF players
Degerfors IF players
Yugoslav First League players
Allsvenskan players
Superettan players
Yugoslav expatriate footballers
Expatriate footballers in Sweden
Yugoslav expatriate sportspeople in Sweden